Cotswold Airport  (formerly Kemble Airfield) is a private general aviation airport, near the village of Kemble in Gloucestershire, England. The Red Arrows aerobatics team was based there until 1983. Today it is used for the storage and recycling of retired airliners, as well as flying schools, clubs, and industry.

Cotswold Airport is located clear of controlled airspace, allowing free movement for training aircraft. It is also centrally positioned between Cheltenham, Gloucester and Swindon. The nearest railway station is at Kemble.

History

RAF Kemble
Construction work for RAF Kemble began in 1936, and the first operational unit to arrive at the station was No. 5 Maintenance Unit on 22 June 1938. In 1940, No. 4 Service Ferry Pool moved to the station from Cardiff, and Kemble became one of the main bases for the aircraft ferrying operations of the Air Transport Auxiliary in this region of the British Isles. Around the same time, Kemble was also the home of No. 1 Overseas Aircraft Preparation Unit (OAPU).

From 1966 until 1983, Kemble housed the Red Arrows, the RAF's aerobatic display team, which operated Folland Gnats and BAe Hawks. After the Red Arrows moved to RAF Scampton, the station was used by the US Air Force as a maintenance facility, initially for A-10 Thunderbolt aircraft, followed by Northrop F-5s, McDonnell Douglas F-15 Eagles, Lockheed C-130 Hercules and Boeing KC-135 Stratotankers.

Following the end of the Cold War, the US Air Force left the station and it was returned to the Ministry of Defence (MoD). The British Army made use of the site to store surplus vehicles and equipment, and military flights ended at the station in March 1993.

Civilian use
The MoD initially leased buildings on the former station before selling the site to Ronan Harvey, a local businessman, in March 2001. As of 2022, his daughter Suzannah Harvey is CEO.

There was a threat of closure because of a mistake which Cotswold District Council made relating to planning permission when it was sold by the MoD. However, this is no longer the case, and the planning status of the airfield has been changed to that of airport. In July 2007, the airfield was again threatened by the council after local residents filed noise-pollution complaints.

In June 2008, the threat of closure eased after Cotswold District Council allowed flying to continue, but in September 2008, North Wiltshire District Council sought to overturn this decision in the High Court as they said the original decision was flawed.

In August 2009, the airport was awarded a CLEUD (Certificate of Lawful Use) as a commercial airport, so its future was assured as an airport and development to that end could occur. Resource Group (formerly Lufthansa Resource Technical Training) relocated their EASA Part 147 Approved Basic Training facility to Cotswold Airport with a purpose-built facility opened in Spring 2010. This had the effect of bringing numerous jobs to the local area as well as supporting local infrastructure, such as shops and hotels. There are around 50 engineering students stationed there year-round.

The site was renamed Cotswold Airport in 2009, having previously operated as Kemble Airport or Kemble Airfield.

The airport has a CAA Ordinary Licence (Number P863), which allows flights for the public transport of passengers or for flying instruction as authorised by the licensee (Kemble Air Services Limited). The airfield has a tarmacadam runway which accommodates large aircraft such as the Boeing 747.

It formerly belonged to the RAF but is now used for gliding by the Cotswold Gliding Club.

Other uses
The airport is home to Chevron Aircraft Maintenance, an EASA part 145 approved aircraft maintenance facility which has been based at the airport since January 2004, carrying out maintenance, storage and dismantling of aircraft.

It is also the operating base of Air Salvage International, who describe themselves as Europe's leading aircraft decommissioning company. Air Salvage moved from Alton, Hampshire in late 2009 to Cotswold Airport, setting up base in Hangar J1. In 2017, the airport was described as "Europe's leading airliner recycling location."

Between 1996 and 2012, hangars at the airport housed the exhibits of the Bristol Aero Collection.

The airport has also been used for Formula One straight line testing, and has one of the largest race tracks for radio-controlled cars in the UK.

When the airport was used by the RAF it boasted two hard-surface runways (13/31 and 08/26).

A proposal was put forward in 2015 for a "sustainable village" with shops and leisure facilities to be built on the  site but this did not come to fruition. , the recently appointed airport manager, Christian Ackroyd (a former Army colonel and pilot) stated his intent to increase and diversify aviation business. This includes plans for new hangars, a new GNSS (GPS) approach to enable more corporate jet use, and a Part 145 maintenance organisation based at the airport.

On 26 October 2020, the airport was announced as the preservation location for G-CIVB, a Boeing 747-400 formerly operated by British Airways in a retrojet livery depicting the Negus & Negus scheme used by BA during the 1970's and 1980's, where it is to serve as an events location, conference site and educational airframe. This plane was purchased for one pound.

In popular culture
The airport has been used as a film location for a number of television programmes and series, including: Top Gear, Casualty, Ultimate Force, Car of the Year Show, Wheeler Dealers, Classic Car Club, Drop the Celebrity and Fifth Gear.

References

External links 

Transport in Gloucestershire
Airports in South West England
Kemble, Gloucestershire
Privately owned airports